Isophrictis kefersteiniellus is a moth of the family Gelechiidae. It was described by Zeller in 1850. It is found in Greece, Crete, North Macedonia, Malta, Italy, France, Spain and Portugal. Outside of Europe, it is found in Libya, Tunisia, Asia Minor and Palestine.

Etymology
The species is named in honour of Georg Adolf Keferstein.

References

  Retrieved April 20, 2018.

Moths described in 1850
Isophrictis
Moths of Europe